The women's sprint K-4 (kayak four) 500 metres competition at the 2018 Asian Games was held on 1 September 2018.

Schedule
All times are Western Indonesia Time (UTC+07:00)

Results

References

External links
Official website

Women's K-4 500 metres